The Moss Creek Women's Invitational was a golf tournament in South Carolina on the LPGA Tour from 1976 to 1985. It was played at the Moss Creek Plantation on Hilton Head Island.

When first announced in January 1976, it was titled the "Ladies Masters" and sponsors planned to pattern the event after the Masters Tournament. A little over a month later, the LPGA announced the tournament's name was being changed to the Women's International. This happened after Masters Tournament officials contacted the tournament's sponsor and threatened to go to court unless the word Masters was removed from the tournament title.

Sally Little, an eventual winner of 15 LPGA events (including two majors), won the inaugural Women's International by one shot over Jan Stephenson.

Winners
Moss Creek Women's Invitational
1985 Amy Alcott

CPC International
1984 No tournament
1983 Hollis Stacy (2)

CPC Women's International
1982 Kathy Whitworth
1981 Sally Little (2)
1980 Hollis Stacy

Women's International
1979 Nancy Lopez
1978 Jan Stephenson
1977 Sandra Palmer
1976 Sally Little

References

External links
Tournament results at Golfobserver.com

Former LPGA Tour events
Golf in South Carolina
Recurring sporting events established in 1976
Recurring sporting events disestablished in 1985
1976 establishments in South Carolina
1985 disestablishments in South Carolina
Women's sports in South Carolina